Victoria Țurcanu (née Gurdiş; born 22 February 1996) is a Moldovan footballer who plays as a defender for the Moldova women's national team.

References

1996 births
Living people
Women's association football defenders
Women's association football goalkeepers
Moldovan women's footballers
Sportspeople from Bălți
Moldova women's international footballers
Moldovan women's futsal players